Good Time Guy is a humorous syndicated comic strip that was distributed by Metropolitan Newspaper Service from June 27, 1927 to December 6, 1930.

It was begun by prolific screenwriter William Conselman under the pen name of Frank Smiley, and well-established artist Mel Cummin. Cummin was succeeded the following year by Dick Huemer (1928–29), who was in turn followed by Fred Fox (1929).

Characters and story
Ron Goulart wrote of Good Time Guy in his book The Funnies:

Conselman's script was dense with "puns and complicated word-play". There was a strong element of serendipity in the strip, with Green's naive missteps leading unexpectedly into good fortune.

References

1927 comics debuts
1930 comics endings
American comics characters
American comic strips
Fictional hillbillies
Humor comics
Public domain comics